Mikon or Micon may refer to:
Micon, ancient Greek sculptor
Mikon, California, unincorporated community
NEG Micon, former Danish wind turbine manufacturer